Ali Elçin (born 1990) is a Turkish/Azerbaijani Greco-Roman wrestler competing in the 55 kg division. He is a member of Ankara ASKI.

Career 

Aliyev won a gold medal at the 2010 European Wrestling Championships in Baku and at the 2012 European Wrestling Championships in Belgrade. Also he won a silver medal at the 2013 European Wrestling Championships in Tbilisi.

References

External links 
 

Living people
Place of birth missing (living people)
Turkish male sport wrestlers
Azerbaijani male sport wrestlers
European Wrestling Championships medalists
1990 births